Jacques Flynn,  (August 22, 1915 – September 21, 2000) was a Canadian lawyer and federal politician, serving in both the House of Commons and Senate.

Flynn was born in Saint-Hyacinthe, Quebec, the grandson of the Premier of Quebec Edmund James Flynn. He both graduated in law from Université Laval and was called to the Quebec Bar in 1939.

A Progressive Conservative, Flynn ran unsuccessfully to represent the riding of Quebec South in the House of Commons in the 1957 election; he came second to the Liberal incumbent, Frank Power. He narrowly defeated Power in a rematch in Quebec South in the 1958 election when John Diefenbaker led the PC Party to a landslide victory.

Flynn became Deputy Speaker of the House of Commons of Canada in 1960. In December 1961, Prime Minister Diefenbaker brought Flynn into the Cabinet of Canada as Minister of Mines and Technical Surveys, a position he held until losing his seat to Liberal challenger Jean-Charles Cantin in the 1962 election that reduced the Conservatives to a minority government. Later that year, he was appointed to the Senate.

Flynn served as Leader of the Opposition in the Senate from 1967 until the 1979 election that brought the Tories back to power. Prime Minister Joe Clark brought Flynn into Cabinet as Minister of Justice. It was unusual for a senator to hold such a senior cabinet portfolio, but as the Conservatives were elected with virtually no representation from Quebec, it was necessary to attempt to achieve regional balance in Cabinet by appointing senators to the body.

With the defeat of the Clark government to Pierre Trudeau's Liberals in the 1980 election, Flynn returned to the position of Leader of the Opposition in the Senate. He continued in that role until the PCs, now led by Brian Mulroney, returned to government in 1984. He remained in the Upper House until his retirement in 1990.

In 1993, he was made an Officer of the Order of Canada.

References

External links
 

1915 births
2000 deaths
Canadian legal scholars
Canadian senators from Quebec
Lawyers in Quebec
Members of the 18th Canadian Ministry
Members of the 21st Canadian Ministry
Members of the House of Commons of Canada from Quebec
Members of the King's Privy Council for Canada
Officers of the Order of Canada
People from Saint-Hyacinthe
Progressive Conservative Party of Canada MPs
Progressive Conservative Party of Canada senators
Quebec people of Irish descent
Université Laval alumni
20th-century Canadian lawyers
Canadian King's Counsel
Academic staff of Université Laval